The Mount Airy Graniteers were a minor league baseball Class D team that represented the city of Mount Airy, North Carolina. The team played under two different names in two leagues over their 13 non-consecutive seasons spanning 1934–1950. The club joined the Bi-State League for the 1934 season. In 1935, the Graniteers changed its name to the Mount Airy Reds and continued to operate in the league through 1937.

During that span, Mount Airy had affiliation agreements with the Cincinnati Reds (1935–1936) and the Pittsburgh Pirates (1937). Then, the team changed its name again to Mount Airy Graniteers and played uninterrupted until the 1941 season. After that, the city was without a professional club for the next four years.

In 1946, the Graniteers resurrected in a new circuit, the Blue Ridge League (1946–1950), playing there uninterrupted until the 1950 season.

One of their most popular players was outfielder Gene Handley, who won a batting crown title with a .403 batting average in 1936. Other major contribution came from pitcher Bob Bowman, who posted a 30-11 record and a 2.91 ERA from 1946–48, including a 17-4 mark with a 3.29 ERA and 197.0 innings pitched in 1947.

In its storied 13-year history, surviving the ups and downs during wartime and postwar times, the team won championship titles in 1948 and 1950, while reaching the postseason in 1940, 1947 and 1949. Since 1950, no other team based in Mount Airy has participated in professional baseball.

Season-by-season

MLB alumni

Bob Bowman
Pat Cooper
Jess Cortazzo
Woody Crowson

Chubby Dean
Vance Dinges
Bill Donovan  
Joe Gantenbein 

Gene Handley 
Frank Kalin
Ernie Kish
Ray Kolp 

<small>
Guy Lacy
Whitey Moore 
Ray Shore
Walt Stephenson

See also
Mount Airy Graniteers players 
Mount Airy Reds players

Sources

1934 establishments in North Carolina
1950 disestablishments in North Carolina
Professional baseball teams in North Carolina
Defunct minor league baseball teams
Cincinnati Reds minor league affiliates
Pittsburgh Pirates minor league affiliates
Baseball teams established in 1934
Baseball teams disestablished in 1950
Surry County, North Carolina
Defunct baseball teams in North Carolina
Bi-State League teams